The Governor of Gozo was the administrator of Gozo, in what is today Malta, between 1530 and 1814. The office was established under Hospitaller rule, and abolished during the early years of British rule in Malta, when chief civil officers were first appointed to administer the island.

The seat of the Governor was a building in the Cittadella known as the Governor's Palace, constructed in the 17th century during the magistracy of Alof de Wignacourt. The building is now a courthouse.

Governors

Hospitaller governors

French occupation 
Gozo was invaded by French troops in June 1798, and they occupied the island until October 1798, when they evacuated the island after a rebellion broke out. During the French occupation, no Governors were appointed, and instead the island was administered by:
Commander: Jean-Louis Ebénézer Reynier (1771–1814)
Lord Lieutenant: Count Romualdo Barbaro (1771–1840)

De facto independence

British rule

References 

 
Lists of political office-holders in Malta
Gozo